David Dalton may refer to:

 David Dalton (writer) (1942–2022), American writer
 David Nigel Dalton, British National Health Service administrator
 David Dalton (violist) (1934–2022), American viola player and author
 David D. Dalton (1822–1894), Secretary of State of Alabama